The 1957–58 Idaho Vandals men's basketball team represented the University of Idaho during the 1957–58 NCAA University Division basketball season. Members of the Pacific Coast Conference, the Vandals were led by fourth-year head coach Harlan Hodges and played their home games on campus at Memorial Gymnasium in Moscow, Idaho.

Idaho played two home games in southern Idaho on consecutive nights in late December, both victories over Utah State, in Twin Falls and Idaho Falls.

Senior guard Gary Simmons of Twin Falls was the UI's first All-American.

References

External links
Sports Reference – Idaho Vandals: 1957–58 basketball season
Gem of the Mountains: 1958 University of Idaho yearbook – 1957–58 basketball season
Idaho Argonaut – student newspaper – 1958 editions

Idaho Vandals men's basketball seasons
Idaho
Idaho
Idaho